Karin Maria Granbom Ellison (born 9 April 1977) is a Swedish Liberal People's Party politician. She was a member of the Riksdag between 2002 and 2014.

External links 

 Karin Granbom at the Riksdag website

1977 births
21st-century Swedish women politicians
Living people
Members of the Riksdag 2002–2006
Members of the Riksdag 2006–2010
Members of the Riksdag 2010–2014
Members of the Riksdag from the Liberals (Sweden)
Women members of the Riksdag